Rendez-vous (English: Appointment) is the eighth studio album by electronic musician and composer Jean-Michel Jarre released on Disques Dreyfus, licensed to Polydor, in 1986. The album art was created by long-time collaborator Michel Granger.

Composition and recording 
Rendez-Vous was created over a period of about two months. It features heavy use of the Elka Synthex, notably so on "Second Rendez-Vous", a track Jarre often performs using a laser harp. As with Zoolook, it contains elements from the album Musique pour Supermarché, in this case it is in "Fifth Rendez-Vous". 

The last track on the album was originally scheduled to include a saxophone part recorded by astronaut Ron McNair on the Space Shuttle Challenger, which would have made it the first piece of music to be recorded in space. However, on January 28, 1986, 73 seconds after lift-off, the shuttle disintegrated and the entire Challenger crew were killed. The track was later dedicated to McNair and the other six astronauts on board Challenger. The saxophone part is played by French jazz reedist Pierre Gossez. The album was recorded and mixed at Croissy studio.

Release 
Rendez-Vous was released in 1986, the album reached no. 9 in the UK charts and no. 52 in the US. in that same year. It won the Instrumental album of the year category, at the Victoires de la Musique, and was nominated for Grammy Award for Best New Age Album in 1987. In April 5, 1986, Jarre performed the large-scale outdoor concert Rendez-vous Houston in Houston, celebrating the 150th anniversary of the founding of Texas and attracting 1.5 million people, marking its second entry into the Guinness World Records.

Jean-Michel presented another performance on October 5, Rendez-Vous Lyon, marking Pope John Paul II's visit to Jarre's hometown, Lyon. In 1998, British commercial broadcaster ITV used a remixed version of "Fourth Rendez-Vous" (called Rendez-Vous 98) for their television coverage of the 1998 FIFA World Cup in France. British group Apollo 440 were credited alongside Jarre for the remix.

Track listing

Alternate track listing 
Some editions of the album had the tracks Second and Fifth Rendez-Vous split up into separate parts, and slightly different timings for Fourth and Last Rendez-Vous (Ron's Piece).

Personnel 
The personnel listed in album liner notes:
 Jean-Michel Jarre – Seiko DS-250, Elka Synthex, Moog synthesizer, Roland JX 8P, Fairlight CMI, E-mu Emulator II, Eminent 310U, EMS Synthi AKS, Laser Harp, RMI Harmonic Synthesizer, Oberheim OB-X, Yamaha DX100, Roland TR-808, Linn 9000, Sequential Circuits Prophet-5, Casio CZ 5000, ARP 2600
 Michel Geiss – ARP 2600, Eminent BV, Roland TR-808, Matrisequencer
 Joe Hammer – E-mu Drumulator, percussions on "Second Rendez-Vous"
 Dominique Perrier – Memorymoog on "Second Rendez-Vous"
 The Choir of Radio France, directed by Sylvain Durand – vocals on "Second Rendez-Vous"
 David Jarre – Baby Korg keyboard on "Fifth Rendez-Vous"
 Pierre Gossez – saxophone on "Last Rendez-Vous (Ron's Piece)"

Charts

Certifications

References

Sources

External links 
 Rendez-vous at Discogs

1986 albums
Jean-Michel Jarre albums
Space Shuttle Challenger disaster